Menominee River State Park and Recreation Area is a state park unit of Wisconsin, United States, in development along the Menominee River.  It was created in 2010 in conjunction with the Menominee River State Recreation Area on the Michigan side of the border river.  The Wisconsin park is located in the towns of Niagara, Pembine, and Beecher in Marinette County in northeast Wisconsin. The  park comprises an undeveloped northern unit and a southern portion with primitive hiking trails and canoe/walk-in campsites.

History
The state of Wisconsin purchased a further  from the Wisconsin Electric Power Company in 2010 and elevated the property to a state park and recreation area. The Wisconsin and Michigan parks are managed by their respective state Departments of Natural Resources. The Wisconsin DNR notes "master planning for the property will begin in 2012 as a joint effort between Wisconsin and Michigan."

Recreation
From  upriver on through the park the Menominee River is a wild and scenic route for canoes and kayaks.  This stretch is largely broad and gentle, with a few rapids and a waterfall requiring portages.  There are three non-reservable campsites along the river, accessible to paddlers or hikers.  The river also supports fishing, particularly for smallmouth bass.

Currently there is only one maintained hiking trail, the primitive Pemene Falls Trail, which follows former logging roads in places.  The park is open to deer hunting in season, and in winter to snowshoeing and cross-country skiing.

References

External links
Menominee River State Park and Recreation Area

Protected areas established in 2010
Protected areas of Marinette County, Wisconsin
State parks of Wisconsin
2010 establishments in Wisconsin